This is a list of cricketers who have played for the Jammu and Kashmir Cricket Association and also those who are notable.

A

 Aftab Ahmed
 Imtiaz Ahmed
 Omar Alam (born 1985)
 Mehjoor Ali (born 1991)
 Suhail Andleev (born 1982)
 Aamir Aziz (born 1990)

B

 Ahmed Bandy (born 1995)
 Samiullah Beigh (born 1981)
 Samad Bhat (born 1995)
 Manvinder Bisla (born 1984)

D

 Manzoor Dar (born 1993)
 Ram Dayal (born 1988)
 Deepak Dogra (born 1991)

G

 Manik Gupta (born 1990)
 Pranav Gupta (born 1993)

H

 Obaid Haroon (born 1986)

I

 Mohsin Iqbal (born 1983)

J

Jasia Akhtar
 Ajay Jadeja (born 1971)

K

 Shubham Khajuria (born 1995)
 Amjad Khan (born 1966)
 Amjad Khan (born 1966)

L
Amir Hussain Lone (born 1990).

M

 Vinayak Mane (born 1982)
 Deepak Manhas (born 1992)
 Mithun Manhas (born 1979)
 Umar Nazir Mir (born 1993)
 Mohammed Mudhasir (born 1988)
 Mohsin Mufti (born 1990)
 Sayim Mustafa (born 1991)

N

 Abid Nabi (born 1985)
 Aquib Nazir
 Umar Nissar (born 1993)
 Ahmed Nizam (born 1986)

P

 Abhinav Puri (born 1994)

Q

 Abdul Qayoom (born 1967)
 Iqra Rasool (born 2000)
 Parvez Rasool (born 1989)
 Waseem Raza (born 1993)
 Adil Reshi (born 1989)

S

 Syed Sagar
 Hiken Shah (born 1984)
 Owais Shah (born 1990)
 Arun Sharma (born 1973)
 Muzaffar Baig ( Born 1966 )
 Paras Sharma (born 1995)
 Rohit Sharma (born 1994)
 Sahil Sharma (born 1989)
 Aditya Singh (born 1973)
 Sukhdev Singh (born 1973)
 Bandeep Singh (born 1989)
 Hardeep Singh (born 1981)
 Mushtaq Mohammad (born 1967)
 Ian Dev Singh
 Vishwajeet Singh (born 1991)
 Zahoor Sofi (born 1987)

 Shahid Latief  (born 2002)
 Saket Sinha (born 1967)
 Salman Bhat (born 1968)
 Ashraf Dar (born 1966)

U

 Irfan-ul-Haq (born 1996)             * Umran Malik

W

 Jatin Wadhwan (born 1994)

References

Jammu and Kashmir cricketers

cricketers